Qualpur  is a village in Kapurthala district of Punjab State, India. The village is administrated by a Sarpanch, who is an elected representative.

Demography 
According to the report published by Census India in 2011, Qualpur has total number of 68 houses and population of 367 of which include 190 males and 177 females. Literacy rate of Qualpur is 47.78%, lower than state average of 75.84%.  The population of children under the age of 6 years is 74 which is 20.16% of total population of Qualpur, and child sex ratio is approximately 897, higher than state average of 846.

As per census 2011, 119 people were engaged in work activities out of the total population of Qualpur which includes 98 males and 21 females. According to census survey report 2011, 94.96% workers describe their work as main work and 5.04% workers are involved in Marginal activity providing livelihood for less than 6 months.

Population data

Caste  
The village has schedule caste (SC) constitutes 95.10% of total population of the village and it doesn't have any Schedule Tribe (ST) population.

Air travel connectivity 
The closest airport to the village is Sri Guru Ram Dass Jee International Airport.

Villages in Kapurthala

References

External links
  Villages in Kapurthala
 Kapurthala Villages List

Villages in Kapurthala district